|}

The Marble Hill Stakes is a Group 3 flat horse race in Ireland open to thoroughbreds aged two years only. It is run at the Curragh over a distance of 6 furlongs (1,207 metres), and it is scheduled to take place each year in May.

The race has been run since 1967. It was run over 5 furlongs prior to 2017. It was previously run as a Listed race before being upgraded to Group 3 from the 2020 running.

Winners since 1988

See also
 Horse racing in Ireland
 List of Irish flat horse races

References

Racing Post:

Flat races in Ireland
Curragh Racecourse
Flat horse races for two-year-olds
Recurring sporting events established in 1967
1967 establishments in Ireland